Invizimals is a PlayStation Portable augmented reality collectible creature video game developed by Novarama, and published by Sony Computer Entertainment Europe. It is the first entry in the Invizimals series, and was bundled with the PSP's camera attachment at launch.

Gameplay
The gameplay of Invizimals has been compared to the Pokémon series, involving players capturing and raising different species of creatures, and allowing the player to battle with them, either against an AI or with others using the PSP's wireless abilities. Unlike Pokémon however, Invizimals requires the player to hunt and capture these creatures within the real world, using the concept of augmented reality, a camera attachment for the PlayStation Portable, and a physical "trap" square-shaped device used as a fiduciary marker. These monsters are spawned at different environments (determined by colors of surfaces and time of day), and the trap is used to capture the monsters. Once captured, players are able to raise and level their monsters, and allow them to learn different attacks that can be used in battle. Players can also use the trap to view their monsters, and take pictures of their collection.

Story
The story follows Kenichi Nakamura, a researcher at PSP R&D in Tokyo. He has made the discovery of invisible animals, which he dubs Invizimals. Invizimals are only visible using an attached PSP camera and pointing it at a device called the trap. Kenichi's life is devoted to finding Invizimals, in addition to furthering the common understanding surrounding them. Only specific people have the aura necessary to see these Invizimals, even among those with access to the same equipment, and Kenichi detects that the player is one of these select few people.

Kenichi's most trusted colleague, Professor Bob Dawson, teaches the player the basics of Invizimal combat and assists Kenichi in his research. Dawson makes the discovery that Invizimals are made of energy, specifically light, and that the light particles that emit off of them in battle - sparks, as Dawson calls them - can be used as a currency in the Invizimal world. After being taught the basics of Invizimal combat, the player hones their skills and trains their Invizimals across various Invizimal fighting clubs spotted across the world.

Kenichi's boss requests that he take a business trip to a business associate of his located in Mumbai, India, and that Kenichi takes vital research data about Invizimals with him. However, after Kenichi disembarks the plane and leaves the airport, he is kidnapped by an unknown man. Kenichi's good friend Jazmin Nayar notifies the player that she could not find Kenichi around the time he was scheduled to meet up with her. The unknown man interrogated Kenichi, as the unknown man had knowledge of Invizimals. However, Kenichi played dumb in the interrogation, and hid the crucial thumb drive with his research data on it, and was eventually let go. After this incident, Kenichi's boss reached an arrangement with another associate of his, Sir Sebastian Campbell, to have Kenichi transferred to the Campbell Castle in England to give Kenichi a safe place to further conduct his research. 

After having met Campbell, the player is invited to a tournament in Berlin where many of Campbell's colleagues are attending. After winning the tournament, the player sits down to have dinner with Rolf, the champion of the Berlin club that the player defeated in the tournament. Rolf asks the player to find his favorite Invizimal for him, and in return, Rolf gives the player a mutant Invizimal, an Invizimal with a different color than normal that is more powerful than its regular counterparts.

Kenichi and Jazmin continue their research in the lower levels of the Campbell Castle, conducting experiments. Kenichi comes to the conclusion that Invizimals can be used as a source of electricity, and is conducting experiments to see how to adequately make use of this. However, in one of his experiments, Kenichi causes the castle's power grid to go out. During the blackout, Kenichi and Jazmin are attacked in a kidnapping plot; Kenichi is successfully kidnapped, but Jazmin managed to escape, sustaining a serious arm injury in the process, and was quickly transferred to Windsor Hospital to rest and heal up. After this happened, Dawson's library was vandalized, destroying many pieces of Dawson's Invizimal research data.

While the player continues research, Campbell notifies the player of a criminal that he suspects engineered the kidnapping plot: Axel Kaminsky, a Russian arms dealer and international terrorist with extensive knowledge of Invizimals. After awhile, the player gets in contact with Kaminsky, who confirms that he has kidnapped Kenichi. After paying a ransom of sparks, the player is allowed into Kaminsky's secret lair, the Viper's Nest, an underground tunnel in Russia where he is keeping Kenichi hostage. After a brief introduction, Dawson and Jazmin manage to hijack Kaminsky's signal temporarily to warn the player of Kaminsky, as he is secretly an incredibly powerful Invizimal battler that has never been defeated. After Kaminsky regains the signal, he challenges the player to a battle.

After the player wins and defeats Kaminsky, Kenichi is freed. Before they can escape the Viper's Nest, Campbell and his security storm the Viper's Nest, where it is revealed that Campbell was the one after the Invizimals all along. Campbell hired Kaminsky personally to carry out his work in attempting to steal all Invizimal knowledge in the world for himself. After revealing his true intentions, Campbell challenges the player to a final showdown, which Campbell loses. After having lost the battle, Kenichi and Campbell enter a brief struggle, during which, Kenichi's damaged PSP system begins to glow brilliantly. With Campbell holding Kenichi's PSP in his hand, a large energy explosion is generated, and Campbell is gone, presumably vaporized by the blast. Kenichi and the player leave the Viper's Nest relatively unscathed.

Scope
The player will be able to collect 100+ invizimals during the course of the game. Each Invizimal has different attacks, powers, and skills. The player can level up their Invizimals by collecting "Watts". The higher the level, the stronger the Invizimal. 
The Invizimal world has 6 different elements: Fire, Water, Earth (rock), Forest (jungle), Ice and Desert. Just like Pokémon, each element has different strengths and weaknesses the player needs to discover. Finally, the player needs to collect sparks, orb-like items that can be used to purchase power-ups in game stores.

Elementals
Elementals are based on the Elements of Invizimals. Fire, Ice, Rock, Ocean, Desert and Jungle.

These are some of the most powerful vectors in the game (Meteor Strike is the strongest). Elementals must be used wisely, as they cost 50 sparks each.
Here is what they look like and what they do:

 Fire: A giant fire ghost comes out of the ground and slaps the opponent, works best with Jungle types.
 Ice: A flying eagle-like spirit jumps out of the trap and dives into the enemy, works best with Fire types.
 Rock: A giant rock monster climbs out of the ground and punches the opponent, works best with Ice types.
 Ocean: A giant water-creature lunges down and squishes Invizimals with its belly, works best with Rock types.
 Desert: A giant sand ghost comes out of the trap and turns into a cyclone making other Invizimals lose health, works best with Ocean types.
 Jungle: A tree comes out fully grown from an acorn, bites the enemy and transforms back into an acorn, works best with Desert types.
 Mutant: Mutated Invizimals which are stronger and harder to find.

Throughout the game, the player has to capture Invizimals to move on to the next mission. Each Invizimal has its own attacks which only they can use. Each attack has its own property (see Scope section). Also, each Invizimal has to be captured in a different way, even though some are the same. This can range from flying the Invizimal through a storm, or just scaring it out of its skin. Plus, while the player is "powering" the trap, the player can find really rare Mutant Invizimals. These can come in different colours and skills compared to their ordinary Invizimal counterparts.

Secret Invizimals
This game also includes a lot of "secret Invizimals" which have to be captured by playing on ad-hoc or infrastructure. There are also some Invizimals that can be captured with secret traps only. This can be Invizimals like Tigershark, Venonweb or Moby.
These secret Invizimals can be found on the internet on sites like: secretinvizimals.com but there are others too.

Awards and reception

Invizimals received "average" reviews according to the review aggregation website Metacritic.

The game received numerous awards, among which are:

 Special Achievement for Innovation, IGN Best of E3 2009, winner.
 Special Achievement for Technological Excellence, IGN Best of E3 2009, winner.
 Game of the Show, IGN Best of E3 2009, runner-up, lost to LittleBigPlanet.
 Best New Gameplay Mechanic, Kotaku Best of E3 2009, runner-up, lost to Scribblenauts.
 Best PSP Game, Kotaku Best of E3 2010, runner-up, lost to God of War: Ghost of Sparta.
 Ciutat de Barcelona Award 2009 in the category of Technical Innovation, awarded from the city's Mayor Office to individuals and companies with outstanding contributions to the culture of the city of Barcelona.
 El Duende cultural magazine award. Category: Technology and Video games.
 Spanish National Videogame Awards 2010. Best Technology.
 Spanish National Videogame Awards 2010. Best Overall Game.

References

External links

2009 video games
Augmented reality games
PlayStation Portable games
PlayStation Portable-only games
Sony Interactive Entertainment games
Video games developed in Spain
Multiplayer and single-player video games
Invizimals
Novarama games